HMCS Mimico was a modified  that served with the Royal Canadian Navy during the Second World War. She served primarily as a convoy escort in the Battle of the Atlantic. She was originally laid down by the Royal Navy as HMS Bullrush but was never commissioned into the RN, being transferred to the RCN before completion. She is named for Mimico, Ontario, a town that was eventually amalgamated into the larger city Toronto, Ontario.

Background

Flower-class corvettes like Mimico serving with the Royal Canadian Navy during the Second World War were different from earlier and more traditional sail-driven corvettes.  The "corvette" designation was created by the French as a class of small warships; the Royal Navy borrowed the term for a period but discontinued its use in 1877. During the hurried preparations for war in the late 1930s, Winston Churchill reactivated the corvette class, needing a name for smaller ships used in an escort capacity, in this case based on a whaling ship design. The generic name "flower" was used to designate the class of these ships, which – in the Royal Navy – were named after flowering plants.

Corvettes commissioned by the Royal Canadian Navy during the Second World War were named after communities for the most part, to better represent the people who took part in building them. This idea was put forth by Admiral Percy W. Nelles. Sponsors were commonly associated with the community for which the ship was named. Royal Navy corvettes were designed as open sea escorts, while Canadian corvettes were developed for coastal auxiliary roles which was exemplified by their minesweeping gear. Eventually the Canadian corvettes would be modified to allow them to perform better on the open seas.

Construction and career
Bullrush was ordered 15 May 1942 as part of the Royal Navy 1942–43 Increased Endurance Flower-class building program. She was laid down 22 February 1943 by John Crown & Sons Ltd. at Sunderland and launched 11 October 1943 . As part of an exchange for s that the RCN intended to use as convoy escorts, the Royal Navy transferred four Flower-class corvettes and twelve s to Canada in order to acquire them. Bullrush was transferred on 8 February 1944 and commissioned as HMCS Mimico into the RCN at Aberdeen. The only significant differences between the RCN and RN 1942–43 Flower classes was a shortened mainmast and varying anti-aircraft armament.

After working up at Stornoway, Mimico was assigned to Western Approaches Command out of Oban. She participated in Operation Neptune, the naval aspect of the invasion of Normandy. She arrived off the beaches one day after the invasion with the convoy she was escorting. She remained as a convoy escort in the English Channel after the invasion, transferring to Portsmouth Command in September 1944 and Nore Command in October.

Mimico departed for a two-month refit in February 1945 at Chatham. After working up she returned to service with Nore Command and continued as such until May 1945, when she departed for Canada.

Mimico was paid off at Sorel, Quebec 18 July 1945. She was transferred to the War Assets Corporation and sold for conversion to a whale-catcher. She reappeared in 1950 as the  Olympic Victor. In 1956 she was sold and renamed Otori Maru No.12. She was renamed one more time, Kyo Maru No.25 in 1962 and last appeared on Lloyd's Register in 1977. The ship was broken up in Japan in 1976.

Notes

External links

 
 

 

Flower-class corvettes of the Royal Canadian Navy
1943 ships